British Arabs are British citizens of Arab descent. They share a common Arab ethnicity, culture, language and identity from different Arab countries. Arabs also come from non-Arab countries as ethnic minorities. 

The majority of British Arabs reside in the British capital of London, and have come largely from the Arab countries of Egypt, Morocco, Palestine, Yemen, Lebanon, Iraq, and the Gulf States.

Overview

Census designation 
"British Arabs" is used as an ethnic designation by the National Association of British Arabs. It is also employed by academics, and in the media. Unlike Black British or Asian British, the term "British Arab" was not one of those employed in government ethnicity categorisations used in the 2001 UK Census and for national statistics. As a result, community members are believed to have been under-counted in previous population estimates according to the National Association of British Arabs (NABA). 

This absence of a separate "Arab" category in the UK census obliged many to select other ethnicity categories. In the late 2000s, the British government announced that an "Arab" ethnicity category would be added to the 2011 UK Census for the first time. The decision came following lobbying by the National Association of British Arabs and other Arab organizations, who argued for the inclusion of a separate "Arab" entry to accommodate under-reported groups from the Arab world.

Demographics 
According to the 2021 United Kingdom census, Arabs in England & Wales enumerated 331,844. Most British Arabs live in the Greater London area, and many are either businesspeople, recent immigrants or students. There are also sizable and long-established Yemeni Arab communities living in both Cardiff and the South Shields area near Newcastle-upon-Tyne.
 
A diverse community, British Arabs are represented in the business and media fields, among other areas. Miladi's 2006 survey of 146 community members during the summer of 2001 reported Al-Jazeera as being the respondents' preferred news outlet. Reasons supplied for the selection included the quality of the station's programs and transmission, its discussion of current issues in the Arab world, and the possibility of giving voice to the community's concerns and positions on various matters.

Additionally, 2010 was a breakthrough year in terms of political participation. Several British Arabs ran for and/or were appointed to office as community representatives.

Including both write-in and tick-box responses, 230,556 Arabs were recorded in the 2011 Census in England, 9,989 in Wales, and 9,366 in Scotland. In NABA's own report on the 2011 Census, it adds up answers from the write-in responses that it classifies as Arab, namely "Arab", "African Arab", "White and Arab", "Moroccan", "Algerian", “Egyptian”, "North African", "Other Middle East", or "White and North African", arguing that this gives a total of 366,769 Arabs in England and Wales but noting that there may be double-counting of individuals in this total, since it is uncertain how many of these individual write-in responses are also included in the general "Arab" category.

History

19th century 
Great Britain and the Arab world have engaged in commercial activities with one another since the medieval times. Yemenis began to migrate to Britain since the 1860s via Aden, the main refuelling stop in the area, and settled around the docks in the port cities of Cardiff, Liverpool, South Shields, Hull, and London. 

At the end of the 19th century, Yemenis working as stokers on steamships began moving ashore and set up boarding schools in the dock area. There are now an estimated 70,000 to 80,000 Yemenis in Britain.

Early 20th century 
Iraqis began settling in London in the 1930s, and the UK has had a significant Iraqi population since the 1940s. Liberal and radical dissidents in the Kingdom of Iraq sought refuge to the UK at the time. Supporters of the monarchy later sought refuge in the UK after it was overthrown in 1958.

Arab migration to the United Kingdom significantly began in the 1940s and 1960s when Egyptians and Moroccans came in search of employment, and this generally increased as the Arab world wrestled for independence from European colonialism.

Late 20th and 21st centuries 
The Palestinian exoduses of 1948 and 1967 saw an influx and through the 70s and 80s. More Arabs arrived from the Gulf in the 1970s during the oil-boom era to set up businesses. Arab refugees also arrived as a result of conflicts in parts of the Arab world, such as the Lebanese civil war from 1975 to 1990 or the instability which followed the invasion of Iraq in 2003. The United Kingdom settled approximately 20,000 Syrian refugees amid the Syrian civil war.

Demographics

Religion 
According to the 2011 Census, the religious breakdown of Arabs in England and Wales, and Scotland can be seen in the table below.

Percentages of Arab population (2011)

Notable British Arabs 
 Jim Al-Khalili (OBE), (British Iraqi) Professor of Theoretical Physics, author, broadcaster and presenter of science programmes on BBC radio and television.

 Dame Zaha Hadid (DBE, RA), (British-Iraqi) renowned architect who received the UK's most prestigious architectural award, the Stirling Prize, in 2010 and 2011 and the first woman to receive the Pritzker Architecture Prize (in 2004).
 Lowkey, (British-Iraqi), musician
 Kefah Mokbel, (British-Syrian), breast surgeon and founder of the UK charity Breast Cancer Hope.
 Mustafa Suleyman, (British-Syrian), entrepreneur and co-founder of DeepMind which Google bought for an estimated £400 million in 2014.
 Alexander Siddig, (British-Sudanese),actor known for his role in Syriana and Kingdom of Heaven.
 Potter Payper, (Algerian-British), singer and rapper.
 Rachid Harkouk, (Algerian-British), Footballer
 Zeinab Badawi, (British-Sudanese), journalist at BBC world (previously ITV and Channel 4 News).
 Shadia Mansour, (British-Palestinian), musician
 Nadia Sawalha, (British-Jordanian), television presenter, cook and actress known for her role as Annie Palmer in EastEnders.
 Kamal El-Hajji, (BEM), (British-Moroccan), Serjeant-at-Arms of the House of Commons (in 2015).
 Moe Sbihi, (MBE), (British-Moroccan), rower and twice Olympic medal winner.
 Naseem Hamed, (British-Yemeni), professional boxer who held multiple featherweight world championships.
 Elyes Gabel, (British-Algerian), actor known for his role in Seasons 1 and 2 of the Game of Thrones.
 Faysal Bettache, (British-Algerian), professional footballer.
 Tarik O'Regan, (British-Algerian), composer and recipient of two British Composer Awards. 
 Mika (singer), (British-Lebanese), singer and songwriter. 
 Amal Clooney (née Alamuddin), (British-Lebanese) barrister specialising in international law and human rights and special envoy on media freedom by the British Foreign and Commonwealth Office.
 Peter Medawar - (British-Lebanese Father), 1960 Nobel Prize winner in Medicine.
 Layla Michelle Moran, (British-Palestinian), member of Parliament, Liberal Democrat MP for Oxford West and Abingdon.
 Eugene Cotran, (British-Palestinian), Circuit judge in England.
 Jade Thirlwall, (Egyptian/Yemeni), musician, part of Little Mix.
 Adam El-Abd, (British-Egyptian), semi-professional footballer and played Egypt national team.
 Joe El-Abd, (British-Egyptian), rugby union player.
 Khalid Abdalla, (British-Egyptian), actor and activist from Maida Vale. 
 Mike Bishay, (British-Egyptian),  rugby league footballer of Greek and Sri Lankan descent.
 Ben Bland, (British-Egyptian), presenter and journalist for the BBC News of Lithuanian-Jewish and Russian-Jewish descent.
 Fady Elsayed, (British-Egyptian), actor. 
 Abdel-Majed Abdel Bary, (British-Egyptian), former rapper and
 Amir El-Masry, (British-Egyptian), actor known for The Night Manager and Tom Clancy's Jack Ryan
 Sir Magdi Yacoub OM FRS: (British-Egyptian) Cardiothoracic surgeon celebrated as the surgeon that carried out UK's first heart and lung transplant in the 1980s.

See also

Arab diaspora
Arabs in Europe
British Arab Commercial Bank
List of British Muslims

References

External links
 National Association of British Arabs
Arab British Centre
 British Arabs Resource Centre Broken link
Arab British Chamber of Commerce (ABCC)
BBC Arab London
Reassessing what we collect website – Arab London History of Arab London with objects and images - Broken link

 
 
Muslim communities in Europe